Walter Bruce (born 1915) was an English professional footballer who played as an inside right.

Career
Born in Sunderland, Bruce played for Workington, Bradford City and Swansea Town. For Bradford City, he made 76 appearances in the Football League, scoring 17 goals; he also made 3 FA Cup appearances.

Sources

References

1915 births
Year of death missing
English footballers
Workington A.F.C. players
Bradford City A.F.C. players
Swansea City A.F.C. players
English Football League players
Association football forwards